Ronald Allan Wotus (born March 3, 1961) is an American retired professional baseball player and coach. He played in Major League Baseball (MLB) as a shortstop and second baseman for the Pittsburgh Pirates, and served as third base coach for the San Francisco Giants. He was drafted in the 16th round of the 1979 Major League Baseball Draft by the Pirates, and made his MLB debut in 1983. He also served as bench coach for the Giants from 1999–2017.

Early life
Wotus grew up in Colchester, Connecticut, and attended Bacon Academy, where he played soccer, basketball, and baseball.

Professional career

Draft and minor leagues
He was drafted in the 16th round of the 1979 Major League Baseball Draft by the Pittsburgh Pirates.

Pittsburgh Pirates (1983–1984)
He debuted with the Pirates in 1983 and also played for them in 1984. In the majors, he batted 12-for-58 (.207) in 32 games.  He played in the Kansas City Royals organization in 1987 and the San Francisco Giants organization in 1988 and 1989, without returning to the majors.

Coaching career

After retiring as a player, Wotus remained in the Giants organization as a minor league manager from 1991 to 1997. He managed the Single-A San Jose Giants (1991–92), the Double-A Shreveport Captains (1993–95), and Triple-A Phoenix Firebirds (1996–97).  Wotus was named California League Manager of Year in 1991 after leading San Jose to a 92–44 record.  In 1997, Wotus was named Pacific Coast League Manager of the Year after the Firebirds finished 88–55, winning 41 of their final 51 games.

Wotus became the Giants' third base coach in 1998 under manager Dusty Baker, and served as bench coach from 1999–2017 under managers Baker, Felipe Alou, and Bruce Bochy.  Wotus said he hoped to manage some day, and interviewed for several major league manager jobs, including the Pirates (2000), Dodgers (2005), Mariners (2013), Rays (2014), and Nationals (2015).  Wotus has also coached the Giants' infielders and was in charge of defensive shifts. After the Giants had a disappointing 2017 season, Wotus was reassigned to third base coach, his original coaching position with the Giants, to help stabilize the team.

On August 10, 2021, Wotus became the second coach in franchise history along with John McGraw to reach 2,000 wins. On August 31, Wotus announced that he would be retiring from full-time coaching following the 2021 season.

On January 26, 2022, Wotus came out of retirement and was hired by the Giants to serve as a special assistant for the 2022 season.

Personal life
Wotus married his wife Laurie (a realtor) in 1987.  They reside in Pleasant Hill, California.

References

External links
, or SF Giants biography

1961 births
Living people
Alexandria Dukes players
Baseball players from Hartford, Connecticut
Buffalo Bisons (minor league) players
Gulf Coast Pirates players
Hagerstown Suns players
Hawaii Islanders players
Major League Baseball bench coaches
Major League Baseball shortstops
Major League Baseball third base coaches
Minor league baseball managers
Nashua Pirates players
Navegantes del Magallanes players
American expatriate baseball players in Venezuela
Omaha Royals players
Phoenix Firebirds players
Pittsburgh Pirates players
Portland Beavers players
Salem Pirates players
San Francisco Giants coaches
Shelby Pirates players
Sportspeople from Hartford, Connecticut
People from Pleasant Hill, California
Bacon Academy alumni